Beshoar is an extinct town in Las Animas County, in the U.S. state of Colorado. The GNIS classifies it as a populated place.

A post office called Beshoar was established in 1901, and closed in 1903. The community was named after Michael Beshoar, a local settler.

References

Ghost towns in Colorado
Geography of Las Animas County, Colorado